Glipa karubei is a species of beetle in the genus Glipa. It was described in 1993.

References

karubei
Beetles described in 1993